Ragnhild Pohanka (31 May 1932 – 18 November 2021) was a Swedish politician. A member of the Green Party and later the Left Party, she served in the Riksdag from 1988 to 1991 and again from 1994 to 1998.

In 1984, Ragnhild Pohanka and Per Gahrton were appointed the first spokespersons of the Swedish Green Party.

References

1932 births
2021 deaths
20th-century Swedish women politicians
Members of the Riksdag from the Green Party
Members of the Riksdag from the Left Party (Sweden)
Women members of the Riksdag
Politicians from Stockholm
21st-century Swedish women politicians